Ylva (She-wolf, female Wolf) is an old Swedish female given name. It is the female form of the masculine given name Ulf and is one of the earliest names to appear in documents. The oldest written proof of the name's occurrence in Sweden was Ingrid Ylva, the mother of Birger Magnusson von Bjälbo from about 1200.

Women with the name
Given name
 Ylva, mononym of a Danish singer
 Ylva Eggehorn (born 1950), Swedish poet and writer
 Ylva Johansson (born 1964), Swedish politician
 Ylva Lindberg (born 1976), Swedish ice hockey player
 Ylva Lööf, Swedish actress
 Ingrid Ylva (c. 1180s-c. 1250), Swedish noblewoman

Fiction

The name has increased in popularity and become internationally better known because of the mother of Vicky the Viking. Ylva is also a character in The Long Ships or Red Orm (original Swedish Röde Orm) by Frans Gunnar Bengtsson.

Other uses

Ylva is also a type of sailing ship (see Ylva).

Sources
This article is based on a translation of the German Wikipedia article.

Swedish feminine given names